Gabriel Eugénio Souza (born 1 January 1997), known as Gabriel Souza, Gabriel or simply Gabi, is a Brazilian football player who plays as a goalkeeper for Portuguese club Sanjoanense.

Club career
He made his professional debut in the Segunda Liga for Famalicão on 9 October 2016 in a game against Sporting Covilhã.

References

External links
 

1997 births
Footballers from São Paulo
Living people
Brazilian footballers
Association football goalkeepers
G.D. Ribeirão players
F.C. Famalicão players
S.C. Beira-Mar players
A.D. Sanjoanense players
Liga Portugal 2 players
Campeonato de Portugal (league) players
Brazilian expatriate footballers
Expatriate footballers in Portugal
Brazilian expatriate sportspeople in Portugal